The 2013–14 Macedonian Third Football League was the 22nd season of the third-tier football league in the Republic of Macedonia, since its establishment. It began in August 2013 and ended in May 2014.

North

Teams

League table

South

Teams

League table

East

Teams

League table

West

Teams

League table

Southwest

Teams

League table

See also
2013–14 Macedonian Football Cup
2013–14 Macedonian First Football League
2013–14 Macedonian Second Football League

External links
MacedonianFootball.com
Football Federation of Macedonia 

Macedonia 3
3
Macedonian Third Football League seasons